The Goryeo military regime was the government of the Goryeo dynasty from the time of the military coup d'état of 1170 to the Sambyeolcho Rebellion of 1270 and the definitive subordination of Korea to the Yuan dynasty. The rule of the Ubong Choe family from 1196 to 1258 is known as the "regime of the Choe clan" (최씨정권, 崔氏政權).

The History of Goryeo exemplifies the period in its evaluation of the reign of one of the kings of the military regime, Sinjong:

List of leaders

See also 
 Kamakura shogunate
 Military of the Goryeo Dynasty

Notes

References

Sources 
 
  

 

Government of Goryeo
Goryeo rulers
13th-century Korean monarchs
12th-century Korean monarchs
Korea history-related lists